Arie van der Zouwen is a Dutch football coach and former footballer. He was the manager of the Hong Kong national football team and both assistant manager and manager of Al Wahda FC. He resides in Kortgene.

Manager career 
Originally from Dordrecht, Van der Zouwen was in the 1980s a frequent scorer for the local EBOH squad. The Dutch clubs he coached are VVGZ (multiple runs), ASWH (1993–1997), VV Strijen (1997–1998), BVV Barendrecht (2004), VV Capelle (2005–2006), VV Dubbeldam (2010–2011?), VV Dongen (2011–2013), VV Kloetinge (2015–2017), and MZC '11 (2017–2018).

In between, from 2000 to 2001 Van der Zouwen coached the Hong Kong national football team. Subsequently he was assistant manager for Jo Bonfrère at the United Arab Emirates-side Al Wahda FC and briefly was Al Wahda's manager. Van der Zouwen interned in coaching at FC Den Bosch.

References

Dutch football managers
Hong Kong national football team managers
Footballers from Dordrecht
ASWH managers
VV Capelle managers
Dutch footballers
Al Wahda FC managers
BVV Barendrecht managers
People from Noord-Beveland
Year of birth missing (living people)
Living people
EBOH players
Association footballers not categorized by position
Footballers from Zeeland
Dutch expatriate sportspeople in the United Arab Emirates
Dutch expatriate sportspeople in Hong Kong
Association football coaches
Dutch expatriate football managers
Expatriate football managers in Hong Kong